George (12 August 1779 – 6 September 1860) ruled the state of Mecklenburg-Strelitz as Grand Duke of Mecklenburg from 1816 until his death.

Early life
Duke George Frederick Charles Joseph of Mecklenburg was born in Hanover, the eighth child of Charles II, Grand Duke of Mecklenburg-Strelitz, and his first wife Princess Friederike of Hesse-Darmstadt. Following the death of his mother in 1782 his father married her sister Charlotte two years later in 1784 and the family moved from Hanover to Darmstadt. George remained in Darmstadt until 1794, when his father succeeded as the ruling Duke of Mecklenburg-Strelitz and George accompanied his father to Neustrelitz.

Heir apparent
Soon after arriving in Neustrelitz, George enrolled at the University of Rostock, where he studied until 1799. After leaving university, George went to Berlin, where he lived at the Prussian court. George's sister Louise was married to the Prussian king, Frederick William III. In 1802 he went to Italy, where he lived until 1804, He then returned to Germany and settled in Darmstadt.

Following the Battle of Jena-Auerstedt in 1806, George travelled to Paris, where he negotiated the entry of Mecklenburg-Strelitz into the Confederation of the Rhine. He also attended the Congress of Vienna in 1814, where Mecklenburg-Strelitz was raised to the status of a grand duchy.

Grand Duke
When George succeeded his father on 6 November 1816, he found the grand duchy in a bad state. He set about raising the standard of education of his subjects by building schools. By the end of his reign, the majority of his subjects could read and write. He also improved agriculture in the grand duchy and abolished serfdom.

George died on 6 September 1860 at Neustrelitz and was succeeded by his eldest son Friedrich Wilhelm.

Marriage and children
On 12 August 1817 in Kassel, George married Princess Marie of Hesse-Cassel, the daughter of Prince Frederick of Hesse-Kassel and his wife, Princess Caroline of Nassau-Usingen.  Together they had four children:

Duchess Luise of Mecklenburg-Strelitz (1818–1842)
Frederick William, Grand Duke of Mecklenburg-Strelitz (1819–1904) married Princess Augusta of Cambridge
Duchess Caroline of Mecklenburg-Strelitz (1821–1876) married Frederick VII of Denmark
Duke Georg August of Mecklenburg-Strelitz (1824–1876) married Grand Duchess Catherine Mikhailovna of Russia.

Ancestry

References

1779 births
1860 deaths
Protestant monarchs
University of Rostock alumni
Nobility from Hanover
Hereditary Grand Dukes of Mecklenburg-Strelitz